Sahab Singh Chauhan (10 January 1950 – 16 August 2018) was an Indian politician from Bharatiya Janata Party. He was elected to Delhi Legislative Assembly from Yamuna Vihar constituency in First, Second, Third and from Ghonda constituency in Fourth and Fifth Delhi Assembly.

He represented Yamuna Vihar three and Ghonda two times. He lost to Shri Dutt Sharma of the Aam Aadmi Party by around 8000 votes in the 2015 elections.

He also served as the President of the Ghonda Zone, B.J.P from 1981 to 1987, Secretary of the Shahdara district from 1988 to 1991, General Secretary of the North East Delhi district from 1991 to 1993, and vice-president of the North East Delhi district.

References

Living people
People from North East Delhi district
People from Bulandshahr
1950 births
Delhi MLAs 2008–2013
Delhi MLAs 2013–2015
Bharatiya Janata Party politicians from Delhi